The 2021 Canadian census was a detailed enumeration of the Canadian population with a reference date of May 11, 2021. It follows the 2016 Canadian census, which recorded a population of 35,151,728. The overall response rate was 98%, which is slightly lower than the response rate for the 2016 census. It recorded a population of 36,991,981, a 5.2% increase from 2016.

Planning 
Consultation on census program content was from September 11 to December 8, 2017. The census was conducted by Statistics Canada, and was contactless as a result of the COVID-19 pandemic in Canada. The agency had considered delaying the census until 2022.

About 900 supervisors and 31,000 field enumerators were hired to conduct the door-to-door survey of individuals and households who had not completed the census questionnaire by late May or early June. Canvassing agents wore masks and maintained a physical distance to comply with COVID-19 safety regulations.

Questionnaire
In early May 2021, Statistics Canada began sending mailings to households throughout Canada containing instructions for completing the census questionnaire. The questionnaires could be completed by returning the paper questionnaire, or by phone or online by using an access code provided in the mailing. Statistics Canada expected about 80% of households to complete the questionnaire online. It was also available in large-print, braille, audio, and video formats. The questionnaire questions were available in a number of languages (Arabic, simplified and traditional Chinese, Italian, Korean, Persian, Portuguese, Punjabi, Russian, Spanish, Urdu, and Vietnamese) and indigenous languages (Atikamekw, Denesuline, Nunavik and Nunavut Inuktitut, Mohawk, Montagnais, Naskapi, Northern Quebec Cree, Ojibwe, Oji-Cree, Plains Cree, Swampy Cree, and Tłı̨chǫ), but the questionnaire had to be completed in either English or French.

The standard short-form questionnaire was to be completed by 75% of households. The other 25% completed a long-form questionnaire to collect data about the household's economic and social state, information about the occupied dwelling, and other data in addition to age, languages spoken, marital status, religious affiliation, and other basic data collected in the short-form questionnaire.

Those who completed the census questionnaire online could listen to a number of soundtracks on Spotify and YouTube prepared by Statistics Canada.

Completing the questionnaire is a legal requirement, and those who refuse to do so may be fined up to $500. It must be completed by citizens of Canada, permanent residents, refugee claimants, and those with a study or work permit.

Data release schedule 
The release dates for data by release topic from the 2021 census are:

 February 9, 2022, for population and dwelling counts;
 April 27, 2022, for age, sex at birth, and gender, type of dwelling;
 July 13, 2022, for families, households, and marital status, Canadian military experience, and income;
 August 17, 2022, for language;
 September 21, 2022, for indigenous peoples, and housing;
 October 26, 2022, for immigration, place of birth, and citizenship, ethnocultural and religious diversity, and mobility and migration;
 November 30, 2022, for education, labour, language of work, commuting and instruction in the official minority language.

Data
Statistics Canada links income and related information obtained from the Canada Revenue Agency, and immigration status obtained from Immigration, Refugees and Citizenship Canada, to the census responses.

The 2021 Canadian census included new questions "critical to measuring equity, diversity and inclusivity". For the first time, questions were asked about commuting methods and the census counted transgender people and people of non-binary gender. Canada has been noted in this instance to be the first country to provide census data on transgender and non-binary people.

Results

The 2021 census recorded a total federal population of 36,991,981, living in 14,978,941 of its 16,284,235 private dwellings. Canada's most- and least-populated provinces were Ontario and Prince Edward Island respectively. Among the three territories, the Northwest Territories was the largest, while Nunavut once again became the smallest territory after briefly overtaking Yukon in 2016.

The population of Canada rose by 5.2 per cent federally since the 2016 census, which recorded a population of 35,151,728.  Three provinces' and one territory's population grew faster than Canada's overall population increase: Yukon – a 12.1 per cent increase, Prince Edward Island – an 8 per cent increase, British Columbia – a 7.6 per cent increase, and Ontario – a 5.8 per cent increase. The rapid growth in Yukon is largely credited to immigration and migration from within Canada. At the other end of the spectrum, only one province and one territory saw a decrease in population since 2016: Newfoundland and Labrador – a 1.8 per cent decrease, and the Northwest Territories — a 1.7 per cent decrease.

The majority of Canadians identified as female at 50.73%, while 49.27% of the population identified as male. The median age overall was 41.6 years – 40.4 years for males and 42.8 years for females.

59,460 Canadians identify as transgender and 41,355 identify as non-binary.

Population and dwellings

Age, sex at birth, and gender

See also 
Demographics of Canada
Statistics Act
2022 Canadian federal electoral redistribution

Notes

References

External links
The 2021 Census at Statistics Canada
Census of Agriculture

Canada
Census
Censuses in Canada